Eric Friedler (born September 8, 1954) is a former professional tennis player from the United States.

Biography
Friedler grew up in Chicago and attended Evanston Township High School. From 1972 to 1976 he was at the University of Michigan, where he played on the varsity tennis team. He was an All-American collegiate player in 1975 and a two-time Big Ten Doubles Champion. 

Following graduation he competed professionally on tour, until 1980. During his career he competed in all four Grand Slam tournaments, in either singles or doubles. Most of his doubles appearances were with Jerry Karzen, including his only main draw entry at Wimbledon in 1977. He was runner-up in the doubles at a Grand Prix tournament in Lafayette in 1979, with Victor Amaya. In singles his best result was a semi-final in Atlanta in 1979, when managed wins over Ferdi Taygan, Rick Meyer and David Schneider. In 1980 he had an upset win in Cincinnati over Peter Fleming, who was the defending champion.

After leaving professional tennis he completed a J.D. degree at the University of Chicago Law School.

At the age of 38, he was a member of the American team which competed in the 1993 Maccabiah Games in Israel.

He now runs a construction company in Chicago.

Grand Prix career finals

Doubles: 1 (0–1)

Challenger titles

Doubles: (2)

References

External links
 
 

1954 births
Living people
American male tennis players
Tennis players from Chicago
People from Evanston, Illinois
Michigan Wolverines men's tennis players
University of Chicago Law School alumni
Jewish American sportspeople
Jewish tennis players
Maccabiah Games tennis players
Maccabiah Games competitors for the United States
Competitors at the 1993 Maccabiah Games
21st-century American Jews